Visayaseguenzia cumingi is a species of sea snail, a marine gastropod mollusk in the family Seguenziidae.

Description
The height of the shell attains 2.5 mm.

Distribution
This marine species occurs off the Philippines.

References

External links
 

cumingii
Gastropods described in 2006